Benton Harbor is a city in Berrien County in the U.S. state of Michigan. It is 46 miles southwest of Kalamazoo and 71 miles southwest of Grand Rapids. According to the 2020 census, its population was 9,103. It is the smaller, by population, of the two principal cities in the Niles–Benton Harbor Metropolitan Statistical Area, an area with 156,813 people. Benton Harbor and the city of St. Joseph are separated by the St. Joseph River and are known locally as the "Twin Cities". Fairplain and Benton Heights are unincorporated areas adjacent to Benton Harbor.

History
Benton Harbor was founded by Henry C. Morton, Sterne Brunson and Charles Hull, who all now have or have had schools named after them. Benton Harbor was mainly wetlands bordered by the Paw Paw River, through which a canal was built, hence the "harbor" in the city's name. In 1860, the village was laid out by Brunson, Morton, Hull and others, and given the name Brunson Harbor.

Brunson, Morton, and Hull also donated land and solicited subscriptions for construction of the canal, which was completed in 1862. It had long been recognized that a canal would be crucial to the town's development, both to drain the marsh and to provide a berthing area for ships.

In 1866, the settlement's name was changed to Benton Harbor in honor of Thomas Hart Benton, a Missouri Senator who helped Michigan achieve statehood. In 1836, Benton Harbor was organized as a village and in 1891 it was incorporated as a city.

The House of David religious group was founded there and once ran a local amusement park.

21st century

The Benton Harbor riots occurred in 1966 and 2003. The first followed a fatal shooting, the second a fatal police pursuit. Several other riots also occurred in the intervening periods.

Water state of emergency

As with the 2014–2019 public health crisis involving the drinking water in Flint, in 2018 higher-than-acceptable levels of lead were found in Benton Harbor's tap water. Water was starting to appear "bubbly and white" to "brown", with a "horrible" taste and poor smell. This was due to lead-based water service lines. Testing found the samples returned lead levels of 22 parts per billion, greater than the 20 parts per billion in Flint and the federal lead action level of 15 parts per billion. High levels of copper were also noted in the annual consumer confidence reports that have been required by Environmental Protection Agency.

Concerns were with the health impacts of lead poisoning. As a result, residents were supplied with free bottled water, including for use with brushing teeth and cooking, for residences and schools. In September 2021, $10 million was budgeted to replace the lead service lines.

Geography

Climate
Benton Harbor has a humid continental climate (Köppen: Dfa) that has very warm summers for the type and also less cold winters than many climates of the classification. Due to lake-effect snow there is very high snowfall relative to precipitation in winter, but far lower than some locations that are farther north in the state.

Demographics

2020 census

2010 census
As of the census of 2010, there were 10,038 people, 3,548 households, and 2,335 families residing in the city. The racial makeup of the city was 89.2% African American, 7.0% White, 0.3% Native American, 0.1% Asian, 0.8% from other races, and 2.6% from two or more races. Hispanic or Latino of any race were 2.2% of the population.

There were 3,548 households, of which 44.3% had children under the age of 18 living with them, 17.0% were married couples living together, 43.2% had a female householder with no husband present, 5.6% had a male householder with no wife present, and 34.2% were non-families. 28.6% of all households were made up of individuals, and 6.9% had someone living alone who was 65 years of age or older. The average household size was 2.77 and the average family size was 3.41.

The median age in the city was 28.3 years. 35.1% of residents were under the age of 18; 10.4% were between the ages of 18 and 24; 24.5% were from 25 to 44; 22.2% were from 45 to 64; and 7.7% were 65 years of age or older. The gender makeup of the city was 46.5% male and 53.5% female.

2000 census
At the 2000 census, there were 11,182 people, 3,767 households and 2,557 families residing in the city. The racial makeup of the city was 92.40% African American, 5.48% White, 0.15% Native American, 0.13% Asian, 0.04% Pacific Islander, 0.14% from other races, and 1.65% from two or more races. Hispanic or Latino of any race were 0.58% of the population.

There were 3,767 households, of which 42.0% had children under the age of 18 living with them, 20.8% were married couples living together, 42.0% had a female householder with no husband present, and 32.1% were non-families. 26.6% of all households were made up of individuals, and 8.2% had someone living alone who was 65 years of age or older. The average household size was 2.91 and the average family size was 3.53.

Age distribution was 39.6% under the age of 18, 9.8% from 18 to 24, 25.9% from 25 to 44, 16.5% from 45 to 64, and 8.2% who were 65 years of age or older. The median age was 25 years. For every 100 females, there were 83.3 males. For every 100 females age 18 and over, there were 72.7 males.

The median household income was $17,471, and the median family income was $19,250. Males had a median income of $27,154 versus $20,105 for females. The per capita income for the city was $8,965, the lowest in Michigan. About 39.6% of families and 42.6% of the population were below the poverty line, including 52.5% of those under age 18 and 29.7% of those age 65 or over.

Government and politics
The Michigan Treasury Department in 2009 sent a team to look into the city's finances. The team's report was a long list of mismanagement to the point that budgets were "effectively meaningless as a financial management tool." The city was $10 million underfunded in its pension fund and increasing budget deficits. In April 2010, Democratic Governor Jennifer Granholm appointed Joseph Harris as Emergency Financial Manager. City staff was reduced by 30 to 70.

Harris was given expanded powers under a new law signed in March 2011 by Republican Governor Rick Snyder. Harris was previously the chief financial officer for the city of Detroit. On April 14, 2011, Harris suspended the decision-making powers of Benton Harbor's elected city officials, who can hold meetings but are not allowed to govern. The Michigan AFL–CIO president called the move "sad news for democracy in Michigan", but at least one city official, City Commissioner Bryan Joseph, supported it, saying the city had been mismanaged for decades.

On January 4, 2012, city commissioners Marcus Muhammad and MaryAlice Adams held a press conference where they stated that if there was still an emergency financial manager administering the city when Benton Harbor hosted the Senior PGA Championship in May, an "Occupy PGA movement should sit in on the golf greens and driving ranges in protest." Occupy PGA did hold protest marches on multiple days during the tournament, but did not disrupt the tournament.

On January 11, 2013, the Emergency Financial Assistance Loan Board (ELB) voted to replace Harris as the Emergency Financial Manager (EFM) for the city. On February 1, 2013, the ELB appointed Tony R. Saunders II as the youngest Successor-Emergency Financial Manager for the city of Benton Harbor.

Library service for the city is provided by the Benton Harbor Public Library.

The town has a police department.

Education
The city is served by two institutions, Benton Harbor Area Schools within the Berrien Regional Education Service Agency, and Lake Michigan College, a two-year community college just east of Benton Harbor.

Economy
Whirlpool Corporation, the world's largest manufacturer of major home appliances, has its corporate headquarters in nearby Benton Charter Township, along with a new Riverview campus near the St. Joseph River in Benton Harbor and the Technical Center in St. Joseph.

Community organizations
Black Autonomy Network Community Organization (BANCO) is a political and social justice coalition working in Benton Harbor.

Transportation

Major highways
 bypasses the city to the east and south, connecting with Kalamazoo and Detroit to the east and with Michigan City, Indiana, and Chicago, Illinois, to the south and southwest.
 travels through the downtowns of both Benton Harbor and St. Joseph. It mostly follows the former route of US 12.
 begins nearby in Benton Township and continues northerly toward Holland, ending at Grand Rapids.
 is currently a freeway (the St. Joseph Valley Parkway) from the Indiana border north, until merging with a five-lane road (Napier Avenue) to a brief connection with I-94. A freeway connection directly to I-94 is under construction as of 2022.
 serves as a loop route connecting with I-196 at the north and running through downtown St. Joseph. M-63 continues on to I-94 and then to M-139, where it ends. M-63 follows the former route of US 33.
 begins at US 12 near Niles and terminates at BL I-94 on the Benton Harbor–Benton Township border (the northbound direction terminates wholly within Benton Township). M-139 follows a former route of US 31 south of I-94.
Spanning the Paw Paw River and providing an additional connection to St. Joseph, the Charles Freeman Joseph bridge on Whitwam Drive, is named for Benton Harbor's first black mayor, opened in late 2005.

Rail
The Amtrak station in St. Joseph is served daily by Amtrak's Pere Marquette passenger train.

Bus
Twin Cities Area Transportation Authority (TCATA) provides bus transit throughout Benton Harbor and the surrounding areas. Originally strictly a dial-a-ride service, it has recently expanded to include three fixed routes—Red Route, Green Route and Blue Route. Red Route serves Benton Harbor, St. Joseph, St. Joseph Charter Township, Lincoln Township, and Royalton Township. Blue and Green routes operate throughout Benton Harbor and Benton Township.

Air
Southwest Michigan Regional Airport provides non-commercial air service.

Shipping
Both Benton Harbor and neighboring St. Joseph are commercial ports that receive bulk goods from lake freighters.

Media
Benton Harbor is served by The Herald-Palladium newspaper, whose offices are in nearby St. Joseph Township, and is part of the South Bend/Elkhart television market. The Benton Spirit community newspaper has also served the community for the past 10 years. The paper was acknowledged by former Governor Granholm's 2003 Benton Harbor Task Force Report as a key communications stakeholder that "proactively assists in the total development of Benton Harbor". Benton Harbor is served by sister radio stations WCXT, WCSY-FM, WQLQ, WIRX, WQYQ, WSJM-FM, and WYTZ, as well as WHFB and some in the South Bend market.

Points of interest

Sites of interest in Benton Harbor are Shiloh House, built in 1910, which served as the administration building and men's dormitory for the House of David colony, a communal religious group; Morton House (on Morton Hill), built in 1849 by Eleazar Morton, which now houses a museum; Jean Klock Park on Lake Michigan; and the Golf Club at Harbor Shores. In neighboring Benton Township is a large fruit market that replaced the fruit market in the "flats" area of Benton Harbor, which was torn down during an urban renewal project in 1967.

The main shopping center is The Orchards Mall.

Sports
An American Basketball Association team (ABA), the Twin City Ballers, played in Benton Harbor for a few games in November 2006, but left the city due to poor attendance at games. Another ABA team, the Lake Michigan Admirals, began play in 2009. The Admirals switched from the ABA to join the Premiere Basketball League for the 2012 season.

Jack Dempsey defended his heavyweight title on September 6, 1920, in Benton Harbor, defeating Billy Miske.

The city hosts the Maytag Ironman 70.3 Steelhead triathlon, a qualifying event for the Ironman 70.3 World Championship.

The city is the birthplace of Iris Kyle, the most successful professional bodybuilder ever, with ten overall Ms. Olympia wins and two heavyweight wins, along with seven Ms. International wins and one heavyweight win.

Festivals

Benton Harbor co-hosts the annual Blossomtime Festival with St. Joseph.

Notable people

 Vearne C. Babcock – member of the Early Birds of Aviation
 Joique Bell – NFL football player for Detroit Lions
 Bill Berry – jazz trumpeter
 Bobo Brazil – professional wrestler
 Wilson Chandler – NBA player for  Philadelphia 76ers
 Don Griffin – professional football player
 Gene Harris (Haire) – jazz pianist
 Niki Haris – singer and daughter of Gene Harris
Clara Edmunds Hemingway – poet, singer, composer, editor
 Don Hopkins – MLB player for Oakland A's
 Ernie Hudson – actor, Ghostbusters
 Arte Johnson – actor and comedian, Laugh-In
 Julie Krone – jockey, first woman to win horse racing's Belmont Stakes
 Iris Kyle – IFBB professional bodybuilder
 Walker "Bud" Mahurin – U.S. Air Force officer
 Jim "Dandy" Mangrum – lead vocalist, Black Oak Arkansas
 Anthony Miller – professional basketball player
 Charles Willard Moore – architect and AIA Gold Medal winner
 Rome (Jerome Woods) – R&B singer
 Sinbad (David Adkins) – actor and comedian
 Ruth Terry – singer and actress
 Robert L. Van Antwerp Jr. - U.S. Army Lieutenant General and Chief of Engineers
 Chet Walker – NBA basketball player for Philadelphia 76ers and Chicago Bulls, 7-time All-Star, 2012 inductee in Basketball Hall of Fame
 Lyman M. Ward – Union Army brigadier general
 Wally Weber – U-M football player, assistant coach, Hall of Honor inductee
 Robert Whaley – NBA basketball player

See also 

 Flint water crisis

References

External links

 
 History of Benton Harbor and tales of village days (by James Pender. Chicago: The Braun Printing Co., 1915)
Benton-Michigan Spirit Community Newspaper

 
Cities in Berrien County, Michigan
Michigan populated places on Lake Michigan
1860 establishments in Michigan